Margaret Coldwell Hassan (born February 27, 1958) is an American politician and attorney serving as the junior United States senator from New Hampshire since 2017. A member of the Democratic Party, Hassan was the 81st governor of New Hampshire from 2013 to 2017.

Born in Boston, Hassan is a graduate of Brown University and earned a J.D. from the Northeastern University School of Law. After graduating from law school in 1985, she worked at the law firm Palmer & Dodge. She later worked as associate general counsel for Brigham and Women’s Hospital.

Hassan first ran for the New Hampshire Senate in 2002 after Democratic Party leaders recruited her. She lost to incumbent Russell Prescott but ran against Prescott again in 2004 and won. Hassan was elected to a total of three two-year terms, representing New Hampshire's 23rd district from January 2005 to December 2010. She became the State Senate majority leader in 2008 before losing reelection in a 2010 rematch with Prescott.

Hassan declared her candidacy for governor in October 2011. She defeated former state senator Jacalyn Cilley in the Democratic primary and faced the Republican nominee, attorney Ovide M. Lamontagne, in the general election. Hassan won with 55% of the vote, becoming the state's second female governor. She was reelected in 2014. After becoming governor, Hassan was elected vice chair of the Democratic Governors Association and served as a superdelegate at the Democratic National Convention.

In 2016, Hassan ran for the U.S. Senate and narrowly defeated Kelly Ayotte, the Republican incumbent, by about a thousand votes (about 0.1% of the vote). She was reelected in 2022, defeating Republican nominee Don Bolduc. She is serving with Jeanne Shaheen, another former governor. Hassan and Shaheen are the only two women in American history to be elected both governor and U.S. senator.

Early life and education
Hassan was born Margaret Wood in Boston, Massachusetts, the daughter of Margaret (Byers) and Robert Coldwell Wood, a political scientist who served as U.S. Secretary of Housing and Urban Development in the Lyndon Johnson administration. She has two siblings, including Tony award-winning actor Frank Wood.

She grew up in Lincoln, Massachusetts. As a child she sang in school choirs and at church. Her parents were politically active and she collated mailers for the League of Women Voters. She attended Lincoln-Sudbury Regional High School, Sudbury, Massachusetts, and graduated with the Class of 1976. Wood then enrolled at Brown University, where she majored in history and graduated in 1980 with a B.A. degree. While there, she met her future husband, Thomas Hassan, also a student at the university. She received a J.D. degree from the Northeastern University School of Law in 1985.

Early career 
From 1985 to 1999, Hassan worked as an attorney. From 1985 to 1992, she worked at the Boston law firm Palmer & Dodge. From 1993 to 1996, Hassan was associate general counsel for Brigham and Women's Hospital.

In 1996, Hassan began working as an attorney for Sullivan, Weinstein & McQuay, a Boston corporate defense and business law firm. In 1999, then-New Hampshire Governor Jeanne Shaheen appointed her as a citizen advisor to the Advisory Committee to the Adequacy in Education and Finance Commission.

New Hampshire Senate

Elections

Hassan first ran for the New Hampshire Senate in 2002 after Democratic Party leaders suggested she run. She lost to incumbent Russell Prescott, 54% to 46%. In 2004, she ran against Prescott again and won, 52% to 48%. In 2006, she was reelected against Natalie Healy, 60% to 40%. In 2008, she defeated Lee Quandt, 57% to 43%. She served as the assistant Democratic whip, president pro tempore, and majority leader of the State Senate during her six years in office. She represented New Hampshire's 23rd district, which includes East Kingston, Exeter, Kensington, Kingston, Newfields, Newmarket, Newton, Seabrook, South Hampton and Stratham.

In November 2010, Hassan lost to Prescott in a second rematch, 53% to 47%, as Republicans regained control of both the state House and state Senate.

Tenure 
Hassan served on the Capital Budget Committee and the Budget Conference Committee. She helped pass the FY2008-09 budget.

In 2008, Senate President Sylvia Larsen chose Hassan to serve as Senate Majority Leader, the number two position in the New Hampshire Senate. Larsen chose her for the position because she wanted someone who would fight to get the Democratic caucus to support the same agenda, at times creating friction between Hassan and her Republican colleagues.

During her tenure as majority leader, Hassan had a major role in legalizing same-sex marriage in New Hampshire. She presented three versions of a same-sex marriage bill, one of which narrowly gained enough support to pass both chambers.

Hassan helped pass the FY2010-11 budget. This budget increased spending by over $1 billion and contained 33 tax and fee increases, including taxing campsites like hotel rooms, a so-called "income tax" on New Hampshire business, and raising vehicle registration fees.

Committee assignments
 Capital Budget Committee
 Commerce, Labor and Consumer Protection
 Finance
 Public and Municipal Affairs (Chair)
 Energy, Environment, and Economic Development (Vice Chair)
 Internal Affairs Committee
 Executive Department and Administration Committee

Governor of New Hampshire

Elections

2012

In October 2011, Hassan announced her candidacy for governor of New Hampshire. She won the Democratic primary with 53% of the vote, defeating former state senator Jacalyn Cilley, who received 39%. Hassan was endorsed by former U.S. President Bill Clinton. Campaign themes included implementing the Affordable Care Act.

In the general election, Hassan defeated Republican nominee Ovide M. Lamontagne, 55% to 43%, carrying every county in the state. Matt Burgess managed her campaign and senior consultants included media consultant Joe Slade White.

Independent expenditure groups spent more than $11 million on Hassan's behalf. Major financial support for her campaign came from the Washington, D.C.-based Democratic Governor's Association, the Service Employees International Union, the American Federation of State, County and Municipal Employees, and the National Education Association.

2014

In June 2014, Hassan filed to run for reelection. In August 2014, New Hampshire Attorney General Joseph Foster, a Hassan appointee, ordered her to return $24,000 in campaign contributions that violated New Hampshire campaign finance laws. In October 2014, Hassan was ordered to return another $25,000 in funds a union donated to her gubernatorial campaign because the union had not properly registered with the state as a political committee.

Hassan defeated Ian Freeman in the September 9 Democratic primary and Republican nominee Walt Havenstein in the general election, 52% to 48%. She carried 7 of 10 counties.

Tenure
Hassan was sworn in as governor for a two-year term on January 3, 2013. In December 2013, she was elected vice chair of the Democratic Governors Association. That year, Hassan signed a bill creating a state sea level rise commission.

During a conflict between two sides of the Demoulas family, which owns the Market Basket grocery chain, Hassan urged the family to resolve the dispute, which threatened 9,000 jobs in New Hampshire.

In July 2015, Hassan vetoed a bill that would have removed the licensing requirement for carrying concealed firearms. In response to New Hampshire's opioid crisis, she appointed Jack Wozmak the state's "drug czar" in early 2015. He resigned one year later in response to complaints about his job performance. Hassan also worked to preserve funding for Planned Parenthood clinics throughout the state.

Hassan resigned as governor on January 2, 2017, to prepare for her swearing-in to the U.S. Senate. Senate president Chuck Morse became acting governor.

U.S. Senate

Elections

2016

On October 5, 2015, Hassan announced her candidacy for the U.S. Senate in 2016. She challenged Republican incumbent Kelly Ayotte. The race was considered one of the most competitive U.S. Senate races of the year.

Hassan was endorsed by the pro-choice Democratic political action committee EMILY's List, which also backed her two gubernatorial runs. Hassan endorsed Hillary Clinton in the 2016 Democratic presidential primary. She said climate change and reproductive rights would be her top priorities if she were elected to the Senate.

On November 9, the day after Election Day, Hassan was declared the winner. Ayotte conceded that evening, choosing not to pursue a recount.

2022

Hassan was reelected in 2022, defeating Republican nominee Don Bolduc.

Tenure

116th Congress (2019–2021)
Hassan participated in a bipartisan Trump administration task force to support the reopening of the economy during the COVID-19 pandemic

Hassan was in the Senate chamber on January 6, 2021, for the 2021 United States Electoral College vote count when Trump supporters stormed the U.S. Capitol. After the Capitol was breached by rioters, Hassan, along with staff and other senators, was removed from the chambers to an undisclosed location. Hassan called the event traumatizing, calling it an "insurrection" and "one of the grimmest days in the history of our country." The following day, she called for Trump to resign, calling him "unfit for office". She also called for an investigation into the lack of security, poor law enforcement response, and how law enforcement treated the Trump supporters, which contrasted with the treatment of Black Lives Matter protestors.

Committee assignments 
 Committee on Finance
 Committee on Health, Education, Labor and Pensions
 Subcommittee on Children and Families
 Subcommittee on Primary Health and Retirement Security
 Committee on Homeland Security and Governmental Affairs
 Subcommittee on Emerging Threats and Spending Oversight (Chair)
Subcommittee on Federal Spending Oversight and Emergency Management
 Subcommittee on Regulatory Affairs and Federal Management
 Committee on Veterans Affairs
 Joint Economic Committee

Controversies
On June 19, 2018, a congressional intern was caught on video yelling, "Mr. President, fuck you!", as Trump walked through the United States Capitol for a meeting with Republican representatives. On June 25, Hassan's office confirmed that a Hassan intern, Caitlin Marriott, was the person caught on video swearing at Trump. A Hassan spokesperson confirmed that Marriott had been suspended from her position for a week and was required to return her congressional intern ID badge. Hassan rejected demands that she fire Marriott.

In 2019, former Hassan staffers Jackson Cosko and Samantha Davis pleaded guilty to federal crimes. Cosko pleaded guilty to five felonies; following his termination from Hassan's staff, he illegally accessed Senate computers, obtained personal information about five Republican senators, and disseminated that personal information online because he was angry about the senators' roles in the confirmation of Brett Kavanaugh to the Supreme Court of the United States. In June 2019, Cosko was sentenced to four years in prison. Davis pleaded guilty to two misdemeanors in July 2019, acknowledging that she had given Cosko access to Hassan's Senate office after he was fired and had lied to investigators about it.

Political positions

As of September 2021, Hassan had voted in line with President Joe Biden's stated position 100% of the time.

Firearms
The National Review reported that Hassan has a "D" rating from the National Rifle Association (NRA) in 2012. She supports a background check system to avoid gun sales to the mentally ill. She was supported by Gabby Giffords and Michael Bloomberg in the 2016 election.

In March 2018, Hassan was one of ten senators to sign a letter to Chairman of the United States Senate Committee on Health, Education, Labor and Pensions Lamar Alexander and ranking Democrat Patty Murray requesting they schedule a hearing on the causes and remedies of mass shootings in the wake of the Stoneman Douglas High School shooting.

Journalism 
In July 2019, Hassan cosponsored the Fallen Journalists Memorial Act, a bill introduced by Ben Cardin and Rob Portman that would create a new memorial that would be privately funded and constructed on federal lands within Washington, D.C. to honor journalists, photographers, and broadcasters who have died in the line of duty.

Marijuana 
As governor, Hassan signed legislation to legalize medical cannabis but said she would veto any bill that came to her desk to legalize recreational cannabis. As of 2020, NORML, an organization that seeks legalization, gave Hassan a C- score as a U.S. senator due to her actions as governor.

Minimum wage 
On February 3, 2021, Hassan announced she opposes raising the federal minimum wage to $15/hour as proposed in President Biden's American Rescue Plan legislation. On March 5, 2021, she and seven other Democratic senators voted with Republicans to block raising the minimum wage as part of the legislation.

Personal life
Hassan's husband, Thomas, was principal of Phillips Exeter Academy from 2008 to 2015, and as of 2016 is the president of School Year Abroad. When he was principal, the Hassans did not live in the Governor's Mansion, instead living in a colonial mansion on the school campus provided to them as part of her husband's employment. In 2016, The Association of Boarding Schools censured Thomas Hassan for failing to disclose a former teacher's sexual misconduct at Phillips Exeter. After he left his position at Phillips Exeter, the Hassans bought and moved into a home in Newfields, New Hampshire.

Hassan has two adult children, the older of whom has cerebral palsy. She is a member of the United Church of Christ.

Hassan has received honorary doctorates from the University of New Hampshire (2013), Northeastern University (2013), Southern New Hampshire University (2014), New Hampshire Institute of Art (2015), New England College (2016), and UNH School of Law (2017).

Electoral history

State Senate

Governor

U.S. Senate

}

See also 
 List of female governors in the United States
 Women in the United States Senate

Notes

References

External links

 Senator Maggie Hassan official U.S. Senate website
 Senate campaign website 
 
 

|-

|-

|-

|-

|-

|-

1958 births
20th-century American lawyers
20th-century American women lawyers
21st-century American politicians
21st-century American women politicians
American women chief executives
Brown University alumni
Christians from New Hampshire
Female United States senators
Democratic Party governors of New Hampshire
Lincoln-Sudbury Regional High School alumni
Living people
Massachusetts lawyers
Democratic Party members of the New Hampshire House of Representatives
New Hampshire lawyers
Democratic Party New Hampshire state senators
Northeastern University School of Law alumni
People from Exeter, New Hampshire
People from Lincoln, Massachusetts
United Church of Christ members
Democratic Party United States senators from New Hampshire
Women state governors of the United States
Women state legislators in New Hampshire